The Fayetteville Academy was established in 1970 as a coeducational secular private school in Cumberland County. The Head of School is Ray Quesnel.

Athletic facilities 
The Norris Gymnasium was built in 1971 and is named for Oscar L. Norris, the Chairman of the original Board of Directors. The school also has a baseball field, soccer field, and track.

References

1970 establishments in North Carolina
Schools in Cumberland County, North Carolina
Education in Fayetteville, North Carolina
Educational institutions established in 1970